The 1983 America East men's basketball tournament was hosted by the higher seeds in head-to-head matchups. The final was held at Case Gym on the campus of the Boston University. Boston University gained its first overall America East Conference Championship with its win over Holy Cross. This was the only year the America East tournament winner was not awarded with an automatic berth to the NCAA tournament.

Bracket and results

* Game Ended in Double-Overtime

See also
America East Conference

References

America East Conference men's basketball tournament
1982–83 ECAC North men's basketball season